Talsi District was a district of Latvia, located in Courland region, in the country's west. It was one of the former 26 rural districts of Latvia and it consisted of 20 local communities. Districts were eliminated on 20 June 2009 as the result of the administrative-territorial reform in 2009.

These included three towns:
 Talsi (12,391 inhabitants)—the center of the district
 Valdemārpils town with its rural territory
 Stende town 
 one region—Sabile Region, including Sabile Town; 
 16 rural municipalities (pagasts): Kolka, Roja, Mērsrags, Dundaga, Balgale, Ģibuļi, Īve, Ķūļciems, Laidze, Lauciene, Lībagi, Lube, Strazde, Valdgale, Vandzene and Virbi.

Talsi District was located in the northern part of Courland. It bordered the districts of Ventspils, Kuldiga and Tukums. It was surrounded by the 96-km-long shoreline of the Gulf of Riga and the Irbe Strait.

The district covered , or 4.1% of the whole territory of Latvia. Woodland covered 55% of Talsi district's territory, 29% was agricultural land, 3.5% was water, and 3.4% (9,400 ha; 23,200 ac) were swamps, of which peat production covered 1,700 ha (4,200 ac).

Demographics
The total population was 49,842 people, or 2.1% of the entire population of Latvia. Nationalities included Latvians - 92%, Russians - 4%, others (Gypsies, Belarusians and Ukrainians) - 4%. Population density was 18 people per square km, compared to the national density of 38 people per square km. 63.5% of the population was urban, and 36.5% was rural.

References

Districts of Latvia